IRIS Gorz is a  serving in the Southern Fleet of the Islamic Republic of Iran Navy. Being able to launch Mehrab (a reverse engineered version of RIM-66 Standard), she is considered the smallest warship in the world to operate such a missile. It is reportedly the only ship in her class that is capable of firing surface-to-air missiles, as of 2020.

History 
During Iran-Iraq War, Gorz was assigned to Bushehr Naval Base.

From 1996 to 1998, she was used for modernization trials.

In the wargame Velayat 90, on 1 January 2012, she fired the missile Mehrab for the first time, marking its first operational test. The ship was modernized in 2015–2021.

See also 

 List of current ships of the Islamic Republic of Iran Navy
 List of military equipment manufactured in Iran

References 

Missile boats of the Islamic Republic of Iran Navy
Ships built at Shahid Tamjidi shipyard
Ships of the Islamic Republic of Iran Navy
Ships built in Iran
Missile boats of Iran
1977 ships
Ships built in France
Iran–Iraq War naval ships of Iran